Mitchell's Brick House Tavern, also known as Oakland, Hite House, Goodwin Tavern, Goodwin House and Coco House, is a historic home located at Arrington, Nelson County, Virginia.  It is a two-story, painted brick Greek Revival-style house with a raised or English basement, built about 1838. The estate consists of the main house with two additions, several dependencies (including an old log smokehouse), a garage, and the small Goodwin Family cemetery.

It is home to the Nelson County Museum of History, who named the project "Oakland."

It was listed on the National Register of Historic Places in 2006.

Gallery

References

External links
 Oakland: Nelson County's Museum of History - official site
 National Register of Historic Places Inventory Nomination Form
 Register Nomination: Mitchell's Brick House Tavern, Nelson County photograph

Houses on the National Register of Historic Places in Virginia
Houses in Nelson County, Virginia
Museums in Nelson County, Virginia
History museums in Virginia
Greek Revival houses in Virginia
Houses completed in 1838
National Register of Historic Places in Nelson County, Virginia